The Final Concert is a 2000 release of a 1983 show in Indianapolis. It is not the last concert from Marvin Gaye's final tour, but is the last one recorded.

Track list
"Third World Girl" M.Gaye
"I Heard It Through the Grapevine" Barrett Strong / Norman Whitfield
"Come Get to This" Marvin Gaye
"Let's Get It On" Marvin Gaye / Ed Townsend
"What's Going On" Renaldo Benson / Al Cleveland / Marvin Gaye
"Joy (Dedication to My Father)" Marvin Gaye
Medley: "Ain't Nothing Like the Real Thing" / "Heaven Must Have Sent You" Nick Ashford / Harvey Fuqua / Marvin Gaye / Valerie Simpson Marvin Gaye feat. Paulette McWilliams
"Inner City Blues (Make Me Wanna Holler)" Marvin Gaye / James Nyx, Jr. / James Nyx
"Distant Lover"  Gwen Fuqua / Marvin Gaye / Sandra Greene
"Sexual Healing" Odell Brown / Marvin Gaye / David Ritz

References

2000 albums
Marvin Gaye albums